Dow  is a surname. Notable people with the surname include:

Albert G. Dow (1808–1908), New York politician
 Arthur Wesley Dow (1857–1922), American painter, printmaker, photographer and arts educator.
Charles Dow (1851–1902), founder of Dow Jones & Co
Cornelia M. Dow (1842–1905), philanthropist, temperance activist; daughter of Neal Dow
Gardner Dow (1898–1919), American college football player
Harold Dow (1947–2010), from the 48 Hours Mystery TV series
Herbert Henry Dow (1866–1930), founder of Dow Chemical Company
James R. Dow, professor of German language
Mary Edna Hill Gray Dow, American financier, school principal and correspondent
Nancy Dow (born 1936), actress, mother of Jennifer Aniston
Neal Dow (1804–1897), noted prohibitionist
Paula Dow (born 1955), 58th Attorney General of New Jersey
Ryan Dow (born 1991), Scottish footballer for Dundee United
Sterling Dow (1903–1995), American epigrapher, historian, and archaeologist of ancient Greece
Tony Dow (1945-2022), American actor who played Wally in the Leave it to Beaver TV series
Tony Dow (director), British television director

See also
 Dowe (disambiguation)
 Dows (surname)